The Hong Kong Senior Shield 2004–05, also known as the Sunray Cave Senior Shield 2004/2005, is the 103rd staging of the Hong Kong's oldest football knockout competition.

The competition started on 9 April 2005 with 9 Hong Kong First Division League clubs and concluded on 13 April 2005 with the final.

Sun Hei captured their 1st title of the competition after beating Happy Valley by 4-2 in the final.

Fixtures and results
All times are Hong Kong Time (UTC+8).

Bracket

Note *: Buler Rangers beat Fukien by 1-0 in the Preliminary Round.

Preliminary round

Quarterfinals

Semi-finals

Final

Top goalscorers

Prizes

See also
 www.rsssf.com Hong Kong 2004/05

References

Hong Kong Senior Shield
Senior Shield
Hong Kong Senior Shield